Ush Tobe Airport is an airport that was put into operation in the city of Vostochnyy that located in Kostanay province of the Republic of Kazakhstan. The airport is considered as small compared to the other airports in big cities of Kazakhstan such as Almaty International Airport, Astana International Airport, or Atyrau Airport in terms of its capacity.

Details

References 

Airports in Kazakhstan